Rohrbach-Berg is a municipality in Rohrbach District of Upper Austria, Austria.  As of 1 January 2019, population was 5183.

The municipality was formed on 1 May 2015 by merging two municipalities, Rohrbach in Oberösterreich and Berg bei Rohrbach. It is the seat of Rohrbach District, having taken it from Berg bei Rohrbach.

Localities 
The municipality includes the following populated places (Ortschaften), with population as of 1 January 2019:

References

Cities and towns in Rohrbach District